Since the early 1980s, violence against women has become more acceptable in Malaysia. Independent women activists in Malaysia came together to organise against violence against women. Their objective was to create a violence-free society. 

Physical and sexual violence against women can occur in various forms such as domestic violence, sexual violence, and emotional violence. In Malaysia, government departments and NGOs such as the Ministry of Women, Family and Community Development and Women's Aid Organisation provides help for said women.

Types

Domestic violence 
Domestic violence, also known as Intimate Partner Violence (IPV), is any behaviour by a current or former partner or spouse that causes physical, sexual, or psychological harm. A study conducted by University of Science, Malaysia's Women's Development Research Centre (Kanita) in 2014 shows that 9% of ever-partnered women in Peninsular Malaysia have experienced domestic violence at some point in their lifetime. WAO's statistics on violence against women shows that domestic violence hse increased from 2000 to 2018. In 2000, there were 3468 cases of domestic violence. In 2018, the number increased to 5513. Women's Aid Organization (WAO) executive director Sumitra Visvanathan suggested that Malaysia principle should be strengthened in this area and perceived it as a serious crime in order to reduce unwanted fatalities.

Female genital mutilation 
Female genital mutilation, also known as FGM, (berkhatan) is practised in Malaysia. In 2009, the Fatwa Committee of the National Council of Islamic Religious Affairs declared that FGM to be compulsory (wajib) for all Muslim women. FGM is a practice that has been the subject of a vigorous policy of zero tolerance from the World Health Organization (WHO).

The issue of such legislative is perceived as “a step backwards” in the fight for women's rights. Historically, the practice of FGM was linked to the coming of Islam and FGM procedures deeply connected to Islam, Islamic notions of body purity in Malaysia and Malay ethnicity. In Malaysia, few people have any specific information and expressed little concern with regard to the practice of FGM in Malaysia. A study conducted in 2012, by Dr. Maznah Dahlui, an associate professor at the University of Malaya's Department of Social and Preventive Medicine, found that 93 percent of Muslim women surveyed had been circumcised. Most Muslim women are circumcised because of religious reasons. A recent survey by Salleha Khalid et al in 2016 of 402 Malay-Muslim women revealed that only a mere 4% – 16 out of 402 women – had not been “circumcised”. In recent years, there are a rising call from organizations such as the UN for abolition of FGM practices in Malaysia. One of it was from the Convention on the Elimination of All Forms of Discrimination against Women (CEDAW) Committee that called for Malaysia to end FGM practices. However, some defended the practice by saying that it would culturally insensitive to abolish FGM completely in Malaysia and arguing that “FGM practiced by the Malay community in north Malaysia is not the same as the FGM performed elsewhere”.

Rape 
From 2000 to 2007, there was an increase of rape cases in all 15 states of Malaysia, from 1217 to 3098 cases. Among all 15 states in Malaysia, Johor had the highest rape cases as of May 2017. Based on the statistics released by the Penang Women Centre for Change, one woman is being raped every 35 minutes in Malaysia. In Malaysia, Section 376 of the Penal Code states that whoever commits rape shall be punished with imprisonment for a term which may extend to twenty years, and shall be liable to whipping.

Marital rape 
Marital Rape is not legally recognised but the new Section 375A states that any husband causing fear of death or hurt to his wife in order to have sex shall be punished for term which may extend to five years. However, marital rape is not criminalised in Malaysia. Since marital rape is not recognised as a crime in Malaysia, it is difficult for women to get access to justice. In a WAO report titled “Perspectives on Domestic Violence” released on International Women's Day on March 8, the NGO said that rape was a crime even if it occurred in a marriage. The report noted that the United Nations Committee on the Convention on the Elimination of All Forms of Discrimination against Women, since 2006, had been asking the Malaysian government to criminalise marital rape.

Legislation 
Women in Malaysia have certain protection against domestic violence such as the Domestic Violent Act 1994 and Article 375 of the Penal Code (prohibition of rape).

Domestic Violence Act 
The Domestic Violence Act took over 10 years to be passed as a law in 1995. This was because when various women's NGO pushed for the enactment, they were met with a lot of resistance by the patriarchal forces of the state.  The Domestic Violence Act provides extensive provisions relating to protective orders (POs) which can be issued by the courts.

These include provisions on: a) Issuance of interim POs pending investigation of any alleged domestic violence offence prohibiting the person against whom the order is made from using domestic violence against the spouse, a child, an incapacitated adult or any other member of the family; b) Issuance of POs prohibiting the person against whom the order is made from using domestic violence against the spouse, a child, an incapacitated adult or any other member of the family during the course of any proceedings before the court involving a complaint of domestic violence; and c) Attaching of additional orders to the protection order.

Article 375 of the Penal Code 
According to the Malaysian law and statutory, the minimum age of consent to participation in sexual activity is 16 years old. The Malaysia statutory rape law is violated when an individual has consensual sexual contact with a person under age 16.

Section 375 of the Penal Code (Malaysia), which covers rape states that (a) against her will; (b) without her consent; (c) with her consent, when her consent has been obtained by putting her in fear of death or hurt to herself or any other person, or obtained under a misconception of fact and the man knows or has reason to believe that the consent was given in consequence of such misconception; (d) with her consent, when the man knows that he is not her husband, and her consent is given because she believes that he is another man to whom she is or believes herself to be lawfully married or to whom she would consent; (e) with her consent, when, at the time of giving such consent, she is unable to understand the nature and consequences of that to which she gives consent; (f) with her consent, when the consent is obtained by using his position of authority over her or because of professional relationship or other relationship of trust in relation to her; (g) with or without her consent, when she is under sixteen years of age.

Explanation - Penetration is sufficient to constitute the sexual intercourse necessary to the offence of rape.

Exception - Sexual intercourse by a man with his own wife by a marriage which is valid under any written law for the time being in force, or is recognized in Malaysia as valid, is not rape.

Explanation 1 - A woman - (a) living separately from her husband under a decree of judicial separation or a decree nisi not made absolute; or (b) who has obtained an injunction restraining her husband from having sexual intercourse with her, shall be deemed not to be his wife for the purposes of this section.

Explanation 2—A Muslim woman living separately from her husband during the period of ‘iddah, which shall be calculated in accordance with Hukum Syara’, shall be deemed not to be his wife for the purposes of this section.

Incidents of violence against women 
On 3 September 2016, two women found guilty of attempting to have sex were caned in Terengganu, a conservative northeastern state in Malaysia, ruled by the Islamist opposition party Pan-Malaysian Islamist Party (PAS). It received criticisms from various rights groups such as Justice for Sisters and the Women's Aid Organisation in Malaysia. It had also received criticisms from global organisations such as Human Rights Watch and Amnesty International, arguing that it was a violation of human rights. Malaysian officials justified the sentence by claiming it was “not painful” and had been intended to “educate” the women.

Consequences 
A recent study identified the pattern of help-seeking by women who have experienced intimate partner violence and their level of satisfaction with the help they receive. It showed that women who experienced IPV suffered various physical and mental health consequences. 81.8% of women who participated in this study reported being physically injured, while more than half reported high emotional distress. The majority of women seek help through friends and family. There were also 13.1% that did not tell anyone about the violence they experienced. This shows that not all survivors report their abuse.

Access to justice for female victims of violence (Organisations) 
There are over 10,000 NGOs in Malaysia. However, only women's NGOs would voice their concern about women and gender issues. Some women NGOs includes Women's Aid Organisation, All Women's Action Society and Sisters in Islam.

Women's Aid Organisation (Pertubuhan Pertolongan Wanita) 

One objective of the Women's Aid Organisation (WAO) is to provide on request to women and their children suffering from mental, physical and sexual abuse, temporary refuge services that empower and enable them to determine their own future. Recently, WOA launched ‘Think I Need Aid’ for women survivors to report domestic violence through Whatsapp. This campaign had increased the number of reports from 699 in 2016 to 1698 in 2017. This increase in number was due to survivors being more comfortable reaching out through Whatsapp.

All Women's Action Society (AWAM) 

AWAM is a non-profit, independent feminist organisation in Malaysia committed to ending gender-based violence and upholding equality and rights for all. It was established in 1998. some recent events that AWAM had organized in 2018 focusing on violence against women were:

 4 June 2018: Workshop on Violence Against Women (VAW) and Child Sexual Abuse (CSA) for UTAR 4th Year Medical Students
 28 April 2018: Unity and Equality Workshop
 7 April 2018: Break the Silence: A workshop on Violence Against Women/Girls and Speaking U

Sisters In Islam 

Sisters In Islam (SIS), formed in 1987, was initially a research, policy, and advocacy organisation based in Kuala Lumpur. Since then, SIS has become a strong force in advocating Muslim women's right in the presence of Islamic revivalism and Islamisation government policies. SIS strives to strike a balance between secular modernity and Islam. SIS had also confronted a variety of major issues including violence against women, women's equality and Islam, Islamic criminal law, and rape. In 1991, SIS had promoted two booklets entitled Are Women and Men Equal Before Allah and Are Muslim Men allowed to Beat Their Wives?, both of which were products of extensive, independent research and interpretation of the Qur’an. These booklets have provided Qur’anic interpretations on the issue of domestic violence. In addition, SIS was one of the women's NGOs that worked to get the Domestic Violence Act to pass.

Activism against violence

Community Walk the Talk to Stop Violence Against Women by WOA 
This program includes talks and workshops about how women and girls can try to protect themselves and avoid becoming victims of physical violence and cyber crimes, such as Master Saiful Hamiruzzam and team spoke and demonstrated about “How to Be Your Own Bodyguard”, and Cathryn Anila spoke on “How to Surf Online Safely (SOS)”

One workshop was also organised by NCWO targeted for the children aged 9 to 18 years on the subject, “The Malaysia We Want for our Family and Country”.

One Stop Crisis Centre (OSCC) 
OSCC is a service provider at all government general hospitals in Malaysia. The objectives of OSCC are to provide the following services to assist victimized survivors who have been physically abused, sexually abused either raped or sodomized. OSCC also work closely with the police, NGO's and the local Social Welfare Department to provide help in the event of a crisis. Services that are available to assist victimized survivors includes medical treatment provided by the medical department, legal protection provided by the police department, temporary shelter assisted by the social welfare department, legal assistance provided by Legal Aid department and, support and counselling provided by non-governmental organisation.

See also 

 Women in Malaysia
 Feminism in Malaysia

References

External links 

Feminism in Malaysia
Malaysia